is a Japanese footballer currently playing as a forward for Kamatamare Sanuki.

Career statistics

Club
.

Notes

References

2003 births
Living people
Association football people from Yamaguchi Prefecture
Japanese footballers
Association football forwards
J3 League players
Kamatamare Sanuki players